The 1996–97 New York Islanders season was the 25th season in the franchise's history. It saw the withdrawal of the "Fisherman" logo from 1995 at the start of the season and the return of the original logo. For the third consecutive year, the Islanders failed to make the playoffs.

Offseason
Captain Patrick Flatley leaves Long Island, signing with the rival New York Rangers. The team does not name a new captain until the 1997–98 season.

Regular season

Final standings

Schedule and results

Player statistics

Regular season
Scoring

Goaltending

Note: Pos = Position; GP = Games played; G = Goals; A = Assists; Pts = Points; +/- = plus/minus; PIM = Penalty minutes; PPG = Power-play goals; SHG = Short-handed goals; GWG = Game-winning goals
      MIN = Minutes played; W = Wins; L = Losses; T = Ties; GA = Goals-against; GAA = Goals-against average; SO = Shutouts; SA = Shots against; SV = Shots saved; SV% = Save percentage;

Awards and records

Transactions

Draft picks
New York's draft picks at the 1996 NHL Entry Draft held at the Kiel Center in St. Louis, Missouri.

References
 

New York Islanders seasons
New York Islanders
New York Islanders
New York Islanders
New York Islanders